Heliopsis parviceps is a Mexican species of flowering plant in the family Asteraceae. It is native western Mexico in the states of Sinaloa, Michoacán, Guerrero, and México.

References

parviceps
Flora of Mexico
Plants described in 1943